Jean-Mattéo Bahoya Négoce (born 7 May 2005) is a French professional footballer who plays as an attacking midfielder for Angers.

Career
Bahoya is a youth product of FE Trélazé, and ES Andard Brain, before moving to the youth academy of Angers in 2014. He was the top scorer for the U17s with Angers, with 30 goals in 25 matches. On 16 May 2022, he signed his first professional contract with Angers until 2025. He was called up to their senior team for the first time in August 2022. He made his professional and senior debut with Angers in a 0–0 (5–4) penalty shootout win over Strasbourg on 6 January 2023.

International career
Born in France, Bahoya is of Cameroonian descent. He is a youth international for France, having played for the France U18s in November 2022.

References

External links
 
 FFF profile
 Ligue 1 profile

2005 births
Living people
People from Montfermeil
French footballers
France youth international footballers
French sportspeople of Cameroonian descent
Angers SCO players
Championnat National 2 players
Association football midfielders